Budapest Honvéd FC II is a Hungarian football club located in Budapest, Hungary. It currently plays in Hungarian National Championship II. The team's colors are red and black.

Current squad
As of 15 October 2017

External links 
  
 Soccerway

Football clubs in Budapest
Association football clubs established in 1909